Funkuro Godrules Amgbare is an Anglican bishop in Nigeria: he is the current Bishop of Northern Izon one of nine in the  Anglican Province of the Niger Delta, itself one of 14 within the Church of Nigeria.

He was elected Bishop in 2018.

Notes

Living people
Anglican bishops of Northern Izon
21st-century Anglican bishops in Nigeria
Year of birth missing (living people)